Spodoptera pulchella, the Caribbean armyworm moth, is a moth of the family Noctuidae found in Florida and Texas, Central America, the Greater Antilles, and the Bahamas. It was first described by Gottlieb August Wilhelm Herrich-Schäffer in 1868.

The wingspan is about 35 mm. Adults have a distinctive curved white line along the posterior margin of the forewing.

References

pulchella
Moths of North America
Moths of the Caribbean
Moths of Cuba
Lepidoptera of Jamaica
Moths described in 1868